Vitreous touch syndrome is a late complication of intra capsular cataract extraction wherein the vitreous bulges through the pupillary aperture, and touches and attaches to the corneal endothelium.

References

Further reading

External links 

Eye diseases
Syndromes